Rodrigo Juliano Lopes de Almeida (born 7 August 1976), usually called Rodrigo is a former Brazilian footballer. He was also called Rodrigo Beckham due to his modelling career and hairstyle similar to David Beckham.

Career

He started his career at local club Portuguesa Santista in 1995, having played for the club in Campeonato Paulista matches and was loaned to Guarani for the 1997 Campeonato Brasileiro Série A. After returning to Portuguesa Santista, he was loaned to Gama and was a key player for the club as they won 1998 Campeonato Brasileiro Série B, scoring 9 goals in 14 matches.

In 1999, Rodrigo joined Botafogo, shining at national level and becoming the club top goalscorer at the 2000 and 2001 Campeonato Brasileiro Série A editions, also being touted to a call-up to Brazil national football team. In 2002, he was loaned to Atlético Mineiro, where he injured his right knee in a match against Cruzeiro.

Rodrigo was signed on loan for Everton in July 2002, choosing his name to be printed as Rodrigol. However, his knee injury was not properly diagnosed and he suffered a ruptured ligament in September and did not play for the club again before being released in May the following year, having played only four mataches. He went on trial with Leeds United in the summer of 2003.

After returning to Brazil, he joined Corinthians in 2004, but he dealt with persistent injuries and surgeries to his knee and could not recover his previous form. Later, he had unsuccessful spells at Juventude, Atlético Paranaense, Vasco da Gama, Paraná and Boavista, before ending his playing career at Red Bull Brasil in 2010.

After retiring, Rodrigo worked as a pundit and, in 2014, became an assistant manager for Boavista, being promoted to manager in the following year. He stayed as manager in 2016 and was replaced by Joel Santana in 2017.

Honours 
Gama
 Campeonato Brasileiro Série B: 1998
 Campeonato Brasiliense: 1998

Boavista
 Campeonato Carioca Série B: 2006

Fortaleza
 Campeonato Cearense: 2009

Red Bull Brasil
 Campeonato Paulista Série A3: 2010

References

External links

Profile at CBF 
Profile at futpedia 

1976 births
Living people
Sportspeople from Santos, São Paulo
Brazilian footballers
Association football midfielders
Campeonato Brasileiro Série A players
Campeonato Brasileiro Série B players
Premier League players
Associação Atlética Portuguesa (Santos) players
Guarani FC players
Sociedade Esportiva do Gama players
Botafogo de Futebol e Regatas players
Clube Atlético Mineiro players
Everton F.C. players
Sport Club Corinthians Paulista players
Esporte Clube Juventude players
Club Athletico Paranaense players
CR Vasco da Gama players
Boavista Sport Club players
Paraná Clube players
Fortaleza Esporte Clube players
Red Bull Brasil players
Brazilian football managers
Boavista Sport Club managers
Brazilian expatriate footballers
Brazilian expatriate sportspeople in England
Expatriate footballers in England